Cover Me is a 1995 direct-to-video erotic thriller film starring Rick Rossovich, Courtney Taylor, Paul Sorvino, Stephen Nichols, Elliott Gould and Corbin Bernsen. It was produced in conjunction with the Orion Interactive CD-ROM game Blue Heat: The Case of the Cover Girl Murders. The plot involves a serial killer preying on the models of a Los Angeles adult magazine and Holly Jacobson (Taylor) a former policewoman,  disguising herself as a nude model in order to lure him out.

External links
 

1995 films
1995 direct-to-video films
American erotic thriller films
1990s erotic thriller films
Direct-to-video thriller films
1990s English-language films
Films directed by Michael Schroeder
1990s American films